The 2018 Illinois judicial elections consisted of both partisan and retention elections, including those for one seat on the Supreme Court of Illinois and five seats in the Illinois Appellate Court. Primary elections were held on March 20, 2018, and general elections were held on November 6, 2018. These elections were part of the 2018 Illinois elections.

Supreme Court of Illinois
Justices of the Supreme Court of Illinois are elected by district. One seat held a retention election.

The court has seven seats total separated into five districts. The first district, representing Cook County, contains three seats, making it a multi-member district, while other four districts are single-member districts. Justices hold ten year terms.

Retention elections
To be retained, judges were required to have 60% of their vote be "yes".

Illinois Appellate Court
Illinois Appellate Court justices hold ten-year terms.

4th district (Appleton vacancy)
Incumbent Peter C. Cavanagh, who was appointed in May 2017 to fill the vacancy left when Tom Appleton resigned his seat, won reelection. This was a special election for two years, as Appeton's term would have ended in 2020.

Democratic primary
No Democratic primary was held, as no candidates filed to run.

Republican primary
Due to the time the vacancy was created being so close to the May 6 filing date for candidates to make the ballot, Cavanaugh was not on the ballot, and instead ran as a write-in candidate.

General election

4th district (Pope vacancy)
Incumbent Republican Thomas M. Harris, Jr., who was appointed in July 2017 to fill the vacancy left when Carole Pope resigned her seat, won reelection, running unopposed in both Republican primary and general election. This was a special election for four years, as Pope's term would have ended in 2022.

Democratic primary
No Democratic primary was held, as no candidates filed to run.

Republican primary

General election

5th district
Republican David K. Overstreet was elected to fill the vacancy that was created after Richard P. Goldenhersh retired in 2017. This was a regular election, as Goldenhersh's term would have expired in 2018.

Democratic primary

Republican primary

General election

Retention elections
To be retained, judges were required to have 60% of their vote be "yes".

Lower courts

Lower courts also saw judicial elections. This included 52 partisan elections to fill vacancies on circuit courts and 34 partisan elections to fill vacancies on subcircuit courts.

References

Judicial
2018